Kursky or Kurskaya may refer to:

People 
 Dmitry Kursky (1874-1932), Soviet Commissar for Justice (1918-1928)

Places 
Kursky District, Kursk Oblast
Kursky District, Stavropol Krai
Kursky Rail Terminal, a rail terminal in Moscow, Russia
Kurskaya (Koltsevaya line), a station of Koltsevaya line of the Moscow Metro
Kurskaya (Arbatsko-Pokrovskaya line), a station of the Arbatsko-Pokrovskaya line of the Moscow Metro
Kurskaya oblast or Kursk Oblast, a federal subject of Russia
Kursky (rural locality), a list of rural localities in Russia
Kursky, Republic of Adygea

See also
Kursk (disambiguation)